Hell or Clean Water is a Canadian documentary film, directed by Cody Westman and released in 2021. The film centres on Shawn Bath, a diver in Newfoundland and Labrador who has organized the Clean Harbours Initiative to clean up garbage on the ocean floor.

The film premiered at the 2021 Hot Docs Canadian International Documentary Festival, where it was named one of five winners of the Rogers Audience Award.

References

External links

2021 films
2021 documentary films
Canadian documentary films
Films shot in Newfoundland and Labrador
Documentary films about water and the environment
2020s English-language films
2020s Canadian films